Glenelg Oval (currently ACH Group Stadium and formerly Gliderol Stadium @ Glenelg) is located on Brighton Road, Glenelg East, South Australia. The ground is primarily used for Australian rules football and cricket and is the home ground for the Glenelg Football Club in the SANFL competition. It is also the home of the Glenelg Cricket Club, and hosts local school football matches, with the Glenelg Primary School located beyond the southern end of the ground. with two seated grandstands holding 1,500.

History
The oval has a current capacity of 15,000 and the entire spectator area on the western side or Brighton Road side of the ground is concrete terracing. This is also where the 500 seat HY Sparkes Stand and the 1,000 seat Edward Rix Stand are located, as well as the Glenelg Cricket Club. The Glenelg Football Club offices, bars and function rooms are located under the Rix Stand. The entire outer side of the ground which extends from goal to goal consists only of grass banking which is less than 5 metres wide on the outer wing. The area behind the southern goals is generally where the Glenelg cheer squad stands for games. At only 160m x 115m Glenelg Oval is among the smallest playing surfaces in the SANFL.

The ground record attendance was set on 20 July 1968 when 17,171 saw Sturt defeat Glenelg by just one point, 13.13 (91) to 13.12 (90).

Glenelg Oval saw the highest ever score kicked by any team in SANFL history when Glenelg defeated Central District 49.23 (317) to 11.13 (79) in Round 18 of the 1975 SANFL season. The 228 point winning margin was also at the time an SANFL record. Tigers champion Full-forward D.K. "Fred" Phillis, a Magarey Medal winner for the Bays in 1969, kicked a Glenelg club record 18 goals in the match. Other stars for Glenelg on that famous day included Graham Cornes, Peter Carey, Peter Marker and John McFarlane. Late in the last quarter McFarlane, who had kicked almost 10 goals for the game, had a shot on goal that would have been the Tigers 50th. The ball hit the post though and was recorded as a point (in Australian Rues Football, if a kicked ball hits the goal posts, even if it then bounces through the goals untouched by any player or bounces back into play, the ball is dead and a point is automatically awarded to the attacking team).

In 2009 the oval was renamed to Gliderol Stadium @ Glenelg as part of a sponsorship arrangement between the football club and its major sponsor, Gliderol Garage Doors. Previously the ground was named "Challenge Recruitment Oval" under sponsorship with employment agency Challenge Recruitment.

On 28 December 2016, Adelaide was hit by wild storms with heavy rain and high winds. The winds caused damage to Glenelg Oval with the roof of the HY Sparkes Stand blown off into the oval's car park.

On 1 November 2018, Glenelg Oval was renamed to "ACH Group Stadium" as part of a partnership between the football club and co-tenant ACH Group.

Glenelg Oval hosted the highest ever partnership in Sheffield Shield cricket on 1 November 2020, with Victorian openers Will Pucovski and Marcus Harris combining for 486 runs for the first-wicket stand in a match between South Australia and Victoria.

Lights
After a long legal battle with local residents which resulted in a court win for the Tigers, the Glenelg Football Club had lights installed at the oval in time for the 2012 SANFL season. On 31 March the club christened their newly lit home ground with an 11.13 (79) to 7.15 (57) win over West Adelaide in front of 6,047 fans.

The record night game attendance at Glenelg Oval was set on 25 April (Anzac Day) during Round 4 of the 2014 SANFL season when 9,299 fans saw Glenelg record its first win of the season by defeating the Adelaide Crows SANFL team 17.21 (123) to 13.8 (86).

Interstate Football
On Saturday 26 May 2012, Glenelg Oval hosted its first ever Interstate game when South Australia defeated Western Australia by 14 points 15.11 (101) to 13.9 (87). Scores were locked at 11.8 (74) each at three-quarter time, but the Croweaters scored 4.3 (27) to 2.1 (13) in the last quarter to win in front of a disappointing crowd of just 2,843, not helped by predicted rain. The teams were playing for the Haydn Bunton, Jr. Trophy.

Cricket
The venue is used by the Glenelg Cricket Club in the South Australian Grade Cricket League. In October 2013, the venue hosted a Sheffield Shield match, due to the redevelopment of the Adelaide Oval not being completed in time for the start of the season; it was the first Shield match which South Australia has ever hosted away from Adelaide Oval.

On 26 February 2014, the South Australian Cricket Association (SACA) announced that should the Southern Redbacks win the right to host the 2013–14 Sheffield Shield Final, scheduled for 21–25 March 2014, the game would be played at Glenelg Oval rather than the Redback's long time home, the Adelaide Oval. This was due to a date clash at the oval which had been pre-booked for a Rolling Stones concert on 22 March. While the SACA have been applauded for announcing the venue change early, there has been outrage among the Adelaide public that the oval's longest tenants have been forced out of the venue due to a one-off rock concert (the South Australian cricket team have been the major tenants of the Adelaide Oval since 1877). State Government Minister for Infrastructure Tom Koutsantonis has also come in for heavy criticism for stating in an interview on radio station FiveAA that the state Labour party has always seen the newly renovated Adelaide Oval as an economic asset and that the stadium is not about sport.

In a sad twist, the Rolling Stones concert at the Adelaide Oval was later postponed due to the death of L'Wren Scott, the partner of lead singer Mick Jagger. Additionally, the Redbacks suffered a late season form slump and failed to reach the Sheffield Shield Final.

In 2016, the oval hosted the Sheffield Shield final, between South Australia and Victoria, due to the Adelaide Oval being unavailable.

References and notes

External links 

Official Website of the Glenelg Football Club
Official Website of the Glenelg Cricket Club

Glenelg Oval at CricketArchive

Australian rules football grounds
Sports venues in Adelaide